Chinna Ammangudi is a village in the Orathanadu taluk of Thanjavur district, Tamil Nadu, India.

Demographics 

As per the 2001 census, Chinna Ammangudi had a total population of 743 with 344 males and 399 females. The literacy rate was 53.44%.

References 

 

Villages in Thanjavur district